Sveinung Valle (1959 – 20 March 2016) was a Norwegian farmer and politician for the Labour Party.

He was a cattle farmer in Lindås, and joined the Labour Party in 1997. He was an elected member of Lindås municipal council and Hordaland county council, chaired Hordaland Labour Party from 2009 to 2014 and Lindås Labour Party. He also chaired Hordaland Agrarian Association, and from 2000 to 2001 he served in Stoltenberg's First Cabinet as State Secretary in the Ministry of Agriculture.

Valle died suddenly in his home in March 2016.

References

1959 births
2016 deaths
People from Lindås
Norwegian farmers
Hordaland politicians
Labour Party (Norway) politicians
Norwegian state secretaries